Thierry Dusautoir (born 18 November 1981) is a French former rugby union player who last played for France at international level and Toulouse in the French Top 14 club competition. Dusautoir was considered a strong ball carrier and possessed incredibly powerful and effective tackling. He broke the record for most tackles in a match, making 38 tackles against the All Blacks in the 2007 World Cup. He was considered one of, if not the best tackler in the world.

He first played for Bordeaux-Bègles before moving to US Colomiers for one season, and then signed with Biarritz. He played in the final of the 2005-06 Heineken Cup at Millennium Stadium in Cardiff, which Biarritz lost to Irish team Munster 23–19. Despite losing the Heineken Cup, Biarritz did manage to win the final of the 2005-06 Top 14 40–13 against Toulouse. He was however part of the side that won the 2010 Heineken Cup Final.

Dusautoir was the World Rugby Player of the Year in 2011, the second French player to win the award. He also owns the record of most tackles in an international rugby game (38 tackles against New Zealand in 2007).

International career
Dusautoir was called up into the French squad for tests during June 2006 against Romania and the Springboks.

He made his debut for France in a test against Romania on 17 June 2006 at Cotroceni Stadium in Bucharest, Romania, which saw France defeat the Romanians 62–14 and Dusautoir scoring a try on his debut. He played in the subsequent match against the Springboks at Newlands Stadium in Cape Town with France again emerging as the victors. He left Biarritz and signed for Toulouse in 2006.

He is perhaps most famous for his try against New Zealand in the quarter final of the 2007 World Cup in Cardiff in which he famously made 38 tackles, two more than the entire All Blacks side. He was nominated for world player of the year solely on this performance. His second-half score helped France to a 20–18 victory over the tournament favourites, despite the fact that he was not in the original 30-man squad and was only called up as a replacement for the injured Elvis Vermeulen. He also captained France to a famous 27–22 win over New Zealand in Dunedin on 13 June 2009. He was linked with Leinster Rugby where he would have replaced Rocky Elsom.

2011 Rugby World Cup
Dusautoir captained France to the 2011 Rugby World Cup Final against the hosts New Zealand, in which he scored France's only try (one of two for the entire game) in the 47th minute (New Zealand's Tony Woodcock scoring the other for the All Blacks) and made 22 tackles, for which he received the Man of the Match award. On the night of the final, one could hear chants of "Dusautoir" coming from the many bars showing the game around the Auckland waterfront.
He was named the 2011 IRB International Player of the Year, thus becoming the second player from France to win the award after former captain Fabien Galthié in 2002. Dusautoir won the award over players such as Jerome Kaino and Ma'a Nonu.

In an interview on Total Rugby in July 2012, Dusautoir spoke about a perceived lack of respect towards his team during the 2011 World Cup. He cited a particular picture from the New Zealand Herald in the week leading up to the Final which showed Sonny Bill Williams and Israel Dagg laughing during training, with the caption '80 minutes before laughing'. Dusautoir also shared about how France's uncomplicated game plan in the Final nearly resulted in a memorable upset:
Our strategy in that match was to resist as long as possible. Having seen the way we were playing throughout the tournament we were aware that we were not at the same level as the All Blacks. That was pretty obvious. But by this time we were sure we were mentally prepared and we were ready to make the most of the opportunity... During the match we played well but we would have liked to have scored a drop goal on top of the great defence we produced. But we played an uncomplicated game and that is ultimately how we managed to surprise them so much.

2012–2015
France's new head coach Philippe Saint-André retained Dusautoir as captain for the 2012 Six Nations Championship, in which France finished fourth.

On 21 October 2012, in a Heineken Cup match against Treviso, Dusautoir twisted his knee in a tackle, suffering a twisted lateral ligament with a slight tear. The injury is expected to sideline him for four to six weeks, meaning that he would miss the 2012 November Tests.

On 11 January 2013, Dusautoir was named in the initial training squad for the 2013 Six Nations Championship, but Saint-André decided to retain Pascal Papé as captain in order to give Dusautoir time to ease his way back into the international team.

Dusautoir lead France to the knockout rounds of the 2015 Rugby World Cup, where they played against New Zealand in the quarter finals, losing 62–13. Dusautoir announced his retirement from international rugby following the tournament.

He is the second French captain after Fabien Pelous to have beaten Australia, New Zealand and South Africa.

International tries

Honours

Biarritz Olympique  
 French Champions (2): 2005,2006
 Heineken Cup Runners Up: 2006

Stade Toulousain 
 French Champions (3): 2008,2011,2012
 Heineken Cup Winners: 2010
 Heineken Cup Runners Up: 2008

France

 Rugby World Cup Runners up: 2011
 Six Nations Champions: 2010
 Grand Slam Winners: 2010
Individual

 World Rugby Player of the Year: 2011

Personal life
Dusautoir was born in Abidjan, Côte d'Ivoire. He has a French father and Ivorian mother. He did not take up rugby until he was 16; before that, his favourite sport was judo.

He is a graduate chemical engineer. He also studied in MBA program at emlyon business school.

References

External links

ESPN Profile

1981 births
Emlyon Business School alumni
Sportspeople from Abidjan
Ivorian rugby union players
French rugby union players
Living people
Rugby union flankers
Biarritz Olympique players
Stade Toulousain players
French sportspeople of Ivorian descent
France international rugby union players
Barbarian F.C. players
World Rugby Awards winners
CA Bordeaux-Bègles Gironde players
US Colomiers players
CA Périgueux players
People from Périgueux
Sportspeople from Dordogne